Lava is a 1985 Indian Hindi film directed by Ravindra Peepat and starring Dimple Kapadia, Asha Parekh, Raj Babbar and Rajiv Kapoor in lead roles. Film directors Krishan Lamba and Anees Bazmee was assistant directors to the Peepat.

Plot

Cast
The cast is listed below:
Dimple Kapadia ...	Rinku Dayal
Asha Parekh ... Amar's mom
Raj Babbar	... Ajit Verma
Rajiv Kapoor ... Amar
Kulbhushan Kharbanda ...	Kul Verna
Rajendra Nath ...	Santosh
Madan Puri	... Dayal
Narendra Nath ... Nath
Sudhir ... Party Guest
Vikas Anand ... Amar's Saviour
Rama Vij ... Kul's wife

Release and reception
In the 2020 book Reviewing Hindi Cinema Since 1945: Movie Guide 2020, the film was described as "A beautifully filmed but an inept revenge saga".

Soundtrack 
The soundtrack of the film contains 6 songs. The music is composed by R.D. Burman, with lyrics authored by Anand Bakshi.

References

External links

1985 films
1980s Hindi-language films